Jamie Morrison (born 30 June 1983) is a British musician and producer from Scotland, best known as the drummer in Welsh band the Stereophonics. He is also known for his playing with Noisettes, Drewford Alabama and Ninjas & Wolves.

Biography
In 2012, Morrison joined the Stereophonics, following his departure from the Noisettes in 2010, a band he had joined in 2003.

Morrison has produced music with songwriter and rapper Fem Fel. The pair collaborate under the name Ninjas & Wolves. Jamie has also produced Fyfe Dangerfield and many other artists under his 'Drewford Alabama' pseudonym.

In July 2022, it was announced that Jamie had also been working in a new band called 86TVs, alongside former Maccabees members Hugo White, Felix White and Will White. This announcement was marked with 86TVs first live performance at Omera, London.

Career 
2003
 Formed Noisettes
 Willis – Live band – UK and Europe tour – TV and radio performances – Drums and percussion
 Sally Hurbert – Demos – Drums
 Rachel Myer – Heart Sails – Album – Drums
 Sia – Live band – Headline Big Chill Festival – Percussion
 King Creosote – Demos – Percussion and vibes

2004
 Noisettes sign to Motown
 The Engineers – Demos – Percussion and vibes
 Tom Baxter – Feather & Stone – Album – Percussion
 Bez – Live band – Rhythm Factory East London – Drums

2005
 Chris Chavez – The Observer – Album – With Clif Norell – Drums
 Kubb – Mother – Album – With Youth – Percussion and vibes
 Martina Topley Bird – Live band and recording – Drums
 Half Cousin – Live band – Drums
 Three Moods Of The Noisettes – EP
 Noisettes Live – EP

2006
 Mystery Jets and Noisettes – Remix – The Boy Who Ran Away B side
 Noisettes – Suspicious Minds – Elvis Cover – Single
 Ben Sommers – Demos – Drums
 Anna Phoebe – Gypsy – Album – Drums
 Frankie Miller – Long Way Home – Album – Drums
 Cibelle – Live band – UK tour – Drums, percussion and vibes

2007
 Noisettes – What's the Time, Mr. Wolf? – Album
 Slow Club – Demos – Percussion
 Fionn Regan – The End of History – Album – Drums, percussion and vibes
 Sean Redmon – I Bet You (EP) – Drums
 Soko – Demos – With Drew McConnell and Ben Lovett – Drums
 Carrie Tree – Demos – Drums, percussion and vibes
 Gabriella Cilmi – Lessons to Be Learned – Album – Drums
 Roselie Denton – 21 Days – Album – With Sam Dixon – Drums

2008
 Mark Ronson – Live band – Ft Florence Welch and Lethal Bizzle – Diesel 30th anniversary birthday – Drums
 Paul Epworth – Consequences – Charity single – Ft Beth Ditto – Percussion
 The Hours – Ali in the Jungle – Music video
 Doveman – Live band – Drums – UK tour
 Infidels – Live band – TV performances – Taratata French music show – Drums
 Rock Against Racism – Victoria Park anniversary show – Ft The View, Poly Styrene, Ed Larkin, Sham 69 and Fyfe Dangerfield – Drums
 Tom Baxter – Live band – Run Fat Boy Run movie premiere – Drums
 Esser – Live band – Drums, percussion and vibes

2009
 Noisettes – Never Forget You – EP
 Noisettes – Wild Young Hearts – Album
 Olivia Ruiz – Mon Petit À Petit – Ft Noisettes – Album
 Noisettes – The Carpenters – Goodbye For Love
 Noisettes – Io Bacio, Tu Baci – The Nine soundtrack
 Noisettes – Don't Upset The Rhythm remix – EP
 Noisettes – When We Were Young – Live – Radio 1's Live Lounge – Volume 4
 Noisettes – I'll Wind – Billie Holiday
 Noisettes Ft Peaches live performance on French television Taratatta
 Charlie Winston – Hobo – Album – Drums and percussion
 Josh Weller – Push (EP) – Drums and percussion
 Dawn Landes – Sweetheart Rodeo – Album – Drums and percussion

2010
 Leaves Noisettes
 KT Tunstall – Tiger Suit – Album – Drums, percussion and vibes
 Fyfe Dangerfield – Fly Yellow Moon – Album – Drums, percussion and vibes
 Modou Touré – Moon – Album – Producer
 Duffy – Live band – UK, USA and Europe – TV and radio performances – Drums
 Martha and the Vandellas – Live band – Drums – Headline Lounge on the Farm Festival

2011
 Bryan Adams – Jock the Hero Dog – Movie soundtrack – With Phil Thornalley – Drums
 Baxter Dury – Happy Soup – Album – Drums
 CocknBullKid – Adulthood – Drums, percussion and vibes
 Emeli Sandé – Demos – Drums – With Jim Abbiss
 Marques Toliver – Demos – Drums, percussion and vibes – With Jim Abbiss
 Rebecca Ferguson – Live band – Drums – UK tour – TV and radio performances
 Terry Reid – Live band – Drums – The Jazz Café
 Patrick Walden – Medical Notes (EP) – Producer
 Jack Savoretti – Live band – London Proud Gallery – Drums
 Songs In The Key Of London – Live band – Ft Squeeze, Ali Campbell, Gary Kemp, Pee Wee Ellis, Boo Hewerdine, Kathryn Williams, Mark Nevin, Nerina Pallot and Clare Teal – Drums

2012
 Join Stereophonics
 Birdy – UK, USA, Europe tours – Drums
 Esser – Live band – UK tour – Keyboards
 Jon Lord – Live band – Drums – Jam at his house
 Willis – Songs Of Molly Drake – Album – Drums and vibes
 Kristina Train – Dark Black – Album – Drums and vibes
 Hey Tourists (EP) With Stephen Street – Drums, percussion and vibes
 Birdy – Live at the Tabernacle – Drums
 Bobbie Gordon – Matters of the Heart (EP) – Drums

2013
 Stereophonics – Graffiti on the Train
 Emma's Imagination – Underway (EP) with Youth – Drums, percussion and vibes
 Richard Lobb – The Hospital for Broken Things – Album – Drums and percussion
 Matt Cardle – Demos – With Philip Thornalley – Drums
 Seye Adelekan – Demos – With Philip Thornalley – Drums
 Babyshambles – Bundles – Single – With Steven Street – Drums

2014
 Sam Semple – Mystery Songs – Album – Drums and percussion
 Nerina Pallot – Year of the EPs (EP) – Drums and percussion
 Róisín Murphy – Mi Senti (EP) Drums and percussion
 Drewford Alabama EP
 Echo and the Bunnymen – Live band – TV and radio – Drums

2015
 Stereophonics – Keep the Village Alive
 I Go To Sleep Ft The Lost Brothers
 Pete Doherty – Flags of the Old Regime – Single – With Steven Street – Drums and percussion
 Helsinki – A Guide for the Perplexed – Album – Drums and percussion
 Beau – That Thing Reality – Album – Drums and percussion
 Ben Murrey (EP) Drums and percussion

2016
 Ninjas & Wolves Ft CA Smith – Single – Producer, musician and songwriter
 If You Want to Make a Song Holla, Vol. 6 – Producer, musician and songwriter
 Pop Morrison – Questions – Single – Producer, musician and songwriter
 Boi Genius – Charade – Short film – With WR Robinson – Producer, musician and songwriter
 Boi Genius – Dreamer – Short film – With Ollie Rillands – Producer, musician and songwriter
 Lucy Silvas – Letters to Ghosts – Album – Drums and percussion
 Imelda May – Single – Percussion – With Jim Abbiss
 Mr. Smith – Together – Album – Drums
 Youth – Various artists – Drums and percussion
 Beth Rowley – Demos – Drums

2017
 Stereophonics – Scream Above the Sounds
 Atlantic Machine – Mosquito – Album – Drums, percussion
 Together With Mr. Smith – Album and YouTube pilot – Drums
 Leah Dou – TBA – Album – With The Invisible Men – Drums and percussion
 Elkka – Try – Producer and songwriter
 Elkka – Touch – Producer

2018
 Pop Morrison – Loyal – Producer and songwriter
 Cat Delphi – Message – Producer and songwriter
 Dawn Landes – Meet Me At The River – Album – Drums and percussion
 Matt Maltese – Bad Contestant – Album – With Hugo White – Drums and percussion
 Jont – Single – Drums
 Phil Thornalley – Astral Drive – Album – Drums
 Jack Jones – Swim Up/It's Not My Thing – With Michael Moore – Single – Drums and producer
 Wicked Games Ft Cat Delphi – Remix – Producer
 Stranger Things Ft Derik Means – Remix – Producer
 Ophelias Song Ft Ella – Remix – Producer
 Heartless Ft Charli B – Remix – Producer
 Don't Get Me Wrong Ft Who's Molly? – Remix – Producer
 1000 kisses Ft Nadia – Remix – Producer
 2 Shy Ft The Kondors – Remix – Producer
 Dakota Ft Jack Jones – Remix – Producer
 Bury My Body Ft Amo – Remix – Producer

2019
 Will White – "Chameleon" – Single – Drums, percussion and vibes
 Son of Dave – "Another Man Down" – Single – Producer
 Son of Dave – "You Keep On Buying It" – Single – Producer
 Amo – "Shuffle" – Single – Producer
 Jamie T – TBA
 Danny Goffey – TBA – Album – Percussion
 Stereophonics – Kind – Album
 Far From Saints – TBA – Album – Drums
 The Life & Times of Drewford Alabama – Album – Producer, musician and songwriter
 TBA – The Edge – Soundtrack – Musician and songwriter

2020
 Nadia Sheikh – "Are You On" – Producer
 Nadia Sheikh – "Get Away" – Producer
 Who's Molly? – "Girls & Boys" – Remix – Producer
 Ana Wolf – Gone – The Unfamiliar – Film – Producer and songwriter
 Birdy – TBA – Album – Drums, percussion and vibes
 Robert Emms – TBA – Drums, percussion and vibes
 Billie Martine – TBA – Drums, percussion and vibes
 Jamie T – TBA
 Goldrey – Feel The Change – Album – Drums

References

1983 births
Living people
Scottish rock drummers
British rock drummers
Tambourine players
21st-century drummers